Park Jin-young's Party People is a South Korean television program hosted by Park Jin-young. It airs on SBS on Saturday at 00:15 (KST) beginning 23 July 2017. It is mainly a music talk show with the atmosphere of a club, with alcoholic drinks.

Episodes

Program

The program usually has a segment called Song Grabbing, where guests each choose a song and perform it in a different way from the original song.

Ratings 
 In the ratings below, the highest rating for the show will be in red, and the lowest rating for the show will be in blue each year.
 NR denotes that the show did not rank in the top 20 daily programs on that date.

External links

References 

2017 South Korean television series debuts
Korean-language television shows
Seoul Broadcasting System original programming
South Korean music television shows
2017 South Korean television series endings